Sleepy Eepee is an EP by American band Great Northern. The songs were originally released as a special b-side disc as part of the band's debut album Trading Twilight for Daylight and only sold at live shows, but due to high demand, they were re-released as an EP in 2008. The album was recorded in 2003-2004 and mixed in 2006.    Former bassist Ashley Dzerigian and former drummer Davey Latter were still part of the recording.

Track listing

References

Great Northern (indie band) albums
2008 EPs